Étienne Eustache Bruix ( Fort-Dauphin, Saint-Domingue, 17 July 1759 – Paris, 18 March 1805) was a French Navy officer and admiral, and Minister of the Navy.

Life 
Bruix was born to a family from Béarn. He started sailing as a volunteer on a slave ship commanded by captain Jean-François Landolphe.

Early career
In 1778, he joined the Navy as a Garde-Marine (officer cadet). He served on the frigates Fox and Concorde, taking part in the Battle of Fort Royal on 29 April and 30 April 1781, in the Invasion of Tobago in May–June, in the Battle of the Chesapeake on 5 September, in the Battle of Saint Kitts on 25 January 1782, and in the Battle of the Saintes on 12 April 1782. He was promoted to Ensign in November 1781.

Bruix was given command of the 10-gun aviso Pivert, and tasked with surveying the coasts and harbours of Saint-Domingue.  He was aided in the task by Puységur.

Bruix was promoted to Lieutenant in May 1786. He was elected member of the Académie de Marine in 1791, and promoted to Captain on 1 January 1793, and given command of the 80-gun Indomptable. However, he was dismissed from the service in October 1794. Retiring to the outskirts of Brest, he wrote a memorandum titled Moyens d'approvisionner la marine par les seules productions du territoire français (Means of Provisioning the Fleet Solely by What Is Produced in French Territory).  This advocacy of naval autarky as a way to defeat British blockades attracted notice, and Navy Minister Laurent Truguet recalled Bruix in 1795 to appoint him to the command of the 74-gun Éole. He held this command up to the moment he was sent to join Villaret-Joyeuse's squadron as Chief of Staff (major general).

Appointment as Navy Minister
Eustache Bruix given command of a division under Admiral Justin Bonaventure Morard de Galles during the French attempt to invade Ireland in 1796. Lazare Hoche noticed him on that campaign and promoted him to contre-amiral in May 1797. He was then appointed Navy Minister from 28 April 1798.

Upon taking office, he rushed to Brest to take personal command of a fleet that was about to sail for Egypt in an attempt to extricate the French army trapped there since its invasion in 1798. Favourable winds and fog allowed him to evade the British blockade, and he sailed South with 25 ships of the line. Anticipating a possible landing in Ireland, still unsettled in the wake of the United Irishmen's rebellion, the blockading fleet drew off North-Westwards, giving Bruix a considerable headstart before realising his true destination. Off Cádiz, Bruix encountered a British blockading force of 15 ships of the line under Lord Keith. Despite his numerical superiority and the 28 Spanish ships of the line harboured in Cadiz, Bruix declined to attack and continued into the Mediterranean.

Having made a detour to Toulon for repairs, Bruix received news that André Masséna was besieged in Genoa, and orders to assist him. He rerouted the fleet to the Gulf of Genoa to resupply the beleaguered army but was driven back by the weather. Meanwhile, Keith had followed him into the Mediterranean and gathered together the scattered British squadrons in the area at Menorca. Bruix abandoned his venture, eluded his pursuers and returned to the Atlantic. He made his junction with a Spanish squadron that attached to his fleet, and he returned to Brest.

After this expedition, known as the Cruise of Bruix, he resigned as Minister of the Navy on 11 July 1799, and took command of the fleet assembled at île d'Aix, ready to sail to Spain, but the British reinforced their blockade, the admiral fell ill and the peace of Amiens prevented the fleet from leaving port. He was promoted to Vice-amiral from 13 March 1799.

Later career and death
Bruix was privy to the secret coup d'état of 18 Brumaire (9 November 1799). After seizing power, Bonaparte promoted Bruix to admiral in 1801, and appointed him as Conseiller d'État the following year.

War having broken out again, Napoléon conceived a plan for a new invasion of England, and put Bruix in command of the flotilla based at Boulogne that would carry the invasion troops across the English Channel.  Bruix undertook the work but in July 1804 refused to obey Napoleon's personal order to take the fleet out of harbour for a review, in the face of a developing storm. The furious Emperor reprimanded Bruix and came close to striking him. A subordinate carried out Napoleon's instruction but at the cost of 200 lives.

Following this incident Bruix fell ill and had to return to Paris, where he died of tuberculosis, aged only 45.

Legacy 
Boulevard de l'Amiral-Bruix in Paris is named in his honour.

Sources and references 
 Notes

References

 Bibliography
 
 
 

External links
 

1759 births
1805 deaths
People from Nord-Est (department)
People of Saint-Domingue
Ministers of Marine and the Colonies
French Navy admirals
French military personnel of the French Revolutionary Wars
French naval commanders of the Napoleonic Wars
French people of Haitian descent
Napoleon's planned invasion of the United Kingdom
19th-century deaths from tuberculosis
Tuberculosis deaths in France
Burials at Père Lachaise Cemetery
Names inscribed under the Arc de Triomphe